ICY may refer to:

 Institute for Colored Youth
 ICY (band)
 I Can Yell, media streaming protocol

See also
 ICy, a robot penguin
 Icy (disambiguation)